Irene of Brunswick, born Adelheid, (c. 1293 – 16/17 August 1324) was the first wife of Andronikos III Palaiologos, and by marriage Empress of Constantinople, although she died before her husband became sole Emperor.

Biography 
She was a daughter of Henry I, Duke of Brunswick-Lüneburg and Agnes of Meissen. Her maternal grandparents were Albert II, Margrave of Meissen and Margaret of Sicily.

In March, 1318, she married Prince Andronikos Palaiologos. He was the eldest son of Michael IX Palaiologos and Rita of Armenia. Her father-in-law was at the time junior co-emperor with his own father, Andronikos II Palaiologos. She joined the Eastern Orthodox Church with her marriage and took the name Irene. They had a son (June 1320 – February 1322).

She died in Rhaedestos during the civil war between Andronikos II and Andronikos III from 1321 to 1328. Her husband claimed the throne for its duration, making her the empress to a rival emperor. Her husband proceeded to marry Anna of Savoy.

External links
Her listing in "Medieval lands" by Charles Cawley. The  project "involves extracting and analysing detailed information from primary sources, including contemporary chronicles, cartularies, necrologies and testaments."

1290s births
1324 deaths
Year of birth uncertain
Old House of Brunswick
Palaiologos dynasty
14th-century German women
14th-century German nobility
14th-century Byzantine empresses
Converts to Eastern Orthodoxy from Roman Catholicism
Burials at Lips Monastery
Daughters of monarchs